Canada took part at the 1982 Commonwealth Games in Brisbane (Australia). With a total of 82 medals, Canada ranked third on the medal tally.

Medals

Medalists

Gold medalists
Athletics:
 Mark McKoy, Men's 100 Metres Hurdles
 Milton Ottey, Men's High Jump
 Bruno Pauletto, Men's Shot Put
 Angella Taylor, Women's 100 Metres
 Debbie Brill, Women's High Jump
 Women's 4x400 Metres Relay team

Badminton:
 Women's double team

Boxing:
 Willie de Wit, Men's Heavyweight
 Shawn O'Sullivan, Men's Middleweight

Shooting:
 Thomas (Tom) Guinn, Men's 50 Metres Pistol Free
 Jean-Francois Sénécal, Men's Air Rifle
 Men's Skeet team

Swimming:
 Mike West, Men's 100m Backstroke
 Dan Thompson, Men's 100m Butterfly
 Cameron Henning, Men's 200m Backstroke
 Victor Davis, Men's 200m Breaststroke
 Alex Baumann, Men's 200m Individual Medley
 Alex Baumann, Men's 400m Individual Medley
 Kathy Bald, Women's 100m Breaststroke
 Anne Ottenbrite, Women's 200m Breaststroke
 Women's 4x100m Medley Relay team

Wrestling:
 Bob Robinson, Men's Featherweight Division
 Richard Deschatelets, Men's Heavyweight Division
 Wyatt Wishart, Men's Heavyweight Plus Division
 Clark Davis, Men's Light Heavyweight Division
 Chris Rinke, Men's Middleweight Division

Silver medalists

Archery:
 Men's F.I.T.A. Double

Athletics:
 Ben Johnson, Men's 100 Metres
 Men's 4x100m Relay team
 Rob Gray, Men's Discus Throw
 Laslo Babits, Men's Javelin
 Dave Steen, Men's Decathlon
 Marcel Jobin, Men's 30 km Road Walk
 Men's 4x100m Relay

Badminton:
 Team Event (mixed)

Cycling:
 Steven Todd Bauer, Men's Road Race (185 km)

Diving:
 Sylvie Bernier, Women's 3m Springboard Diving
 Jennifer McArton, Women's High Diving/Tower

Shooting:
 Jim Timmerman, Men's Rapid Fire Pistol
 Men's Smallbore Rifle 3 Positions (team)

Swimming:
 Cameron Henning, Men's 100m Backstroke
 Victor Davis, Men's 100m Breaststroke
 Peter Szmidt, Men's 200m Freestyle
 Peter Szmidt, Men's 400m Freestyle
 Anne Ottenbrite, Women's 100m Breaststroke
 Kathy Bald, Women's 200m Breaststroke
 Cheryl Gibson, Women's 200m Individual Medley

Weightlifting:
 Guy Greavette, Men's 82.5 kg Combined

Wrestling:
 Raymond Takahashi, Men's Flyweight Division

Bronze medalists

Archery:
 Women's F.I.T.A. Double

Athletics:
 Gregory Duhaime, Men's 3000 m Steeplechase
 Guillaume Leblanc, Men's 30 km Road Walk
 Zbigniew Dolegiewicz, Men's Discus Throw
 Lubomir Chambul, Men's Shot Put
 Susan Kemel, Women's 100 Metres Hurdles
 Angella Taylor, Women's 200 Metres
 Jill Ross, Women's Heptathlon
 Rosemary Hauch, Women's Shot Put

Badminton:
 Men's Double

Boxing:
 Kevin McDermott, Men's Middleweight

Cycling:
 Alex Stieda, Men's 4000m Individual Pursuit

Diving:
 John Nash, Men's High Diving/Tower
 Kathy Kelemen, Women's High Diving/Tower

Shooting:
 Thomas (Tom) Guinn, Men's Air Pistol
 Men's Air Pistol (team)
 Guy Lorion, Men's Smallbore Rifle 3 Position
 Men's Smallbore Rifle Prone (team)

Swimming:
 Wade Flemons, Men's 100m Backstroke
 Tom Ponting, Men's 100m Butterfly
 Michelle MacPherson, Women's 100m Butterfly
 Michael West, Men's 200m Backstroke
 Cheryl Gibson, Women's 200m Backstroke
 Katherine Richardson, Women's 200m Breaststroke
 Jeffrey Sheehan, Men's 200m Individual Medley
 Michelle MacPherson, Women's 400m Individual Medley
 Men's 4x100m Freestyle Relay team

Weightlifting:
 Kevin Roy, Men's 100 kg Combined
 Mario Leblanc, Men's 110 kg Combined
 Jacques Demers, Men's 75 kg Combined

Wrestling:
 Maldwyn Cooper, Men's Light Flyweight Division
 Lloyd Renken, Men's Lightweight Division
 Brian Renken, Men's Welterweight Division

External links
 
 Commonwealth Games Canada

1982
Nations at the 1982 Commonwealth Games
Commonwealth Games